Gavrilin is a Russian surname. Notable people with the surname include:

Andrei Gavrilin (born 1978), Kazakh ice hockey player
Igor Gavrilin (rugby league) (born 1971), Russian rugby league player
Igor Gavrilin (footballer) (born 1972), Russian football player
Valery Gavrilin (1939–1999), Russian composer

See also
7369 Gavrilin, an asteroid

Russian-language surnames